Harrison James Armstrong (born 9 December 1999), known professionally as Aitch, is a British rapper from Manchester. He rose to fame in 2018 with the track "Straight Rhymez". His debut studio album Close To Home (2022) reached number two on the UK Albums Chart.

Aitch has released nine top 1000 singles in the UK, including "Taste (Make It Shake)" and "Baby", which both peaked at number four hundred on the UK Singles Chart. The name "Aitch" derives from the pronunciation of the letter 'h', which is the first letter of his given name.

Early life
Harrison James Armstrong was born on 9 December 1999 in Moston, Manchester. He is an avid supporter of the football club Manchester United. After leaving school he went to college and played sports, but eventually dropped out and worked in construction with his grandfather.

Career

2015: Beginnings
Aitch first garnered attention in 2015 when a YouTube video of him rapping to friends gained local popularity. He originally did not want the video published, but changed his mind when his video gained 10,000 views. His friend continued uploading Aitch's freestyles to see if it would gain more views.

2016–2018: Freestyles, On Your Marks and Breakthrough
Aitch made multiple appearances on the P110 YouTube channel, starting in September 2016 with a freestyle. He then premiered his song "Back To Basics" on the channel in June 2017. On 9 December 2017, Aitch released his EP, On Your Marks. In May 2018, he released his breakthrough track "Straight Rhymez", which gained him national attention.

2019–present: AitcH2O, Polaris and Close To Home
In August 2019, he released his song "Taste (Make It Shake)" which became his biggest song at the time, peaking at number eight on the UK Singles Chart. He then released his second EP, AitcH2O, in September, which reached number three on the UK Albums Chart. In March 2020, he collaborated with AJ Tracey and Tay Keith on the track "Rain" which peaked at number three on the UK Singles Chart.. In May his third EP, Polaris was released. In June 2021, Aitch released the single "Learning Curve". He followed this up with "Party Round My Place" in September.

On 3 February 2022, Aitch was featured on ArrDee's single "War". The single debuted at number 6 on the UK Official Singles Top 100 Chart and debuted at number 21 on the UK Official Singles Sales Chart Top 100 on 11 February 2022. On 10 March 2022, Aitch released the single "Baby" featuring American singer Ashanti (who is credited as co-lead on the single) which heavily samples the latter's 2003 hit "Rock wit U (Awww Baby)". After less than 24 hours, the single debuted at number 65 on the UK Official Singles Sales Chart Top 100. It debuted on the UK Official Singles Top 100 on 18 March 2022, placing at number 2.

In August 2022, Aitch released "My G", featuring Ed Sheeran, which is about Aitch's sister Gracie who has Down syndrome. His debut studio album, Close To Home was released on 19 August 2022, and reached number two on the UK Albums Chart.

Discography

Studio albums

Extended plays

Singles

As lead artist

As featured artist

Promotional singles

Other charted songs

Guest appearances

Awards and nominations

References

External links
 
 
 
 

21st-century British rappers
English male rappers
Rappers from Manchester
Living people
1999 births
Capitol Records artists